The 9th Bodil Awards was held 26 April 1956 in Copenhagen, Denmark, honouring the best in Danish and foreign film of 1955.

The evening started with a preview screening of Alexander Mackendrick's The Ladykillers. American actor Fess Parker was guest and performed on stage in leather jacket and fur hat songs from Davy Crockett, King of the Wild Frontier.

The winner this year was På tro og love (On my Honor) directed by Torben Anton Svendsen. Ove Sprogøe got a well-deserved award for his performance in the film, and Sigrid Horne-Rasmussen received a Bodil for Altid ballade (Always Trouble).

La Strada directed by Federico Fellini won the Bodil Award for Best European Film, and Marty directed by Delbert Mann won the award for Best American Film.

The Bodil Award for Best Documentary had not been handed out since 1948, but Bjarne Henning-Jensen received the second ever awarded for his documentary Hvor bjergene sejler.

Honorees

Best Danish Film 
 På tro og love directed by Torben Anton Svendsen

Best Actor in a Leading Role 
 Ove Sprogøe in På tro og love

Best Actress in a Leading Role 
 Sigrid Horne-Rasmussen in Altid ballade

Best Actor in a Supporting Role 
 Not awarded

Best Actress in a Supporting Role 
 Not awarded

Best European Film 
 La Strada directed by Federico Fellini

Best American Film 
 Marty directed by Delbert Mann

Best Documentary 
 Hvor bjergene sejler directed by Bjarne Henning-Jensen

References

Further reading

External links 
 9th Bodil Awards at the official Bodil Awards website

1955 film awards
1956 in Denmark
Bodil Awards ceremonies
1950s in Copenhagen
April 1956 events in Europe